Deluxe Corporation is an American payments and business technology company. Its four business divisions comprise payments, cloud, promotional products, and checks. As of 2020, Deluxe has approximately 4.5 million small businesses and 4,000 financial institutions as customers. As part of its services, Deluxe produces personal and business checks as well as offering marketing, web development, web hosting, and fraud protection services.

Deluxe was previously based in the St. Paul suburb of Shoreview, Minnesota until the company announced in September 2020 that it would move its headquarters to downtown Minneapolis in 2021. Its subsidiary brands include New England Business Services Inc. (NEBS), McBee (formerly Royal McBee) and Checks Unlimited.

Deluxe has facilities in the United States, Canada, Australia, and Europe to conduct its printing and fulfillment, call center, web server, and administrative functions.

History

1900–1959 
 William Roy (W.R.) Hotchkiss founded the company in 1915 as Deluxe Check Printers.

Deluxe Corporation was founded as Deluxe Check Printers in Saint Paul, Minnesota, after Hotchkiss secured a $300 loan. Hotchkiss was the creator of speed-enhancing inventions, including the Hotchkiss Imprinting Press (patented in 1925), a two-way perforator, and the Hotchkiss Lithograph Press (patented in 1928). He also created the first personal flat-pocket checkbook and holder. For most of its early history, Deluxe was primarily a check printing company. Business service operations were not added until later.

1960–1989 
The company was privately held until 1965, during which time it began using magnetic ink character recognition (MICR) check printing technology. By the 1980s, the company was facing reduced demand for its products and increasing competition. In 1988, the company incorporated and changed its name to Deluxe Corporation. In the early 1990s it expanded into customer service for businesses.

1990–present 
As use of digital payment systems gained popularity, Deluxe's core business was impacted significantly. In the mid-1990s, the company announced an expansion of its transaction processing and software businesses. Deluxe began selling business forms and supplies, promotional products and branched out to offer other business services, such as payroll. In 1999, Deluxe employed 15,400 people and operated thirteen check-printing plants whereas by 2004, Deluxe employed 9,300, with eight plants. Deluxe acquired small business services provider New England Business Service in 2004. Deluxe shifted its focus from printing products to primarily business services in 2008. It launched an employee background-screening service called HireRight and expanded its service offerings through acquisitions. This included the purchase of Hostopia (web hosting), Logo Mojo (logo design), PartnerUp (market intelligence), and the 2009 acquisition of search engine marketer MerchEngines.

From 2010 onward, Deluxe expanded its offerings to include web hosting, marketing services, promotional items, payroll management tools, and other services by acquiring more than fifty companies, including online printing service PsPrint and web-based marketing firm OrangeSoda, email marketing company VerticalResponse (2014), transaction processing company Wausau Financial Services (2014), and logo designer LogoMix (2018), among others. It also began offering echecks.

Deluxe launched a reality television show called Small Business Revolution. The show is distributed on Hulu and Amazon Prime Video. Co-hosts have included Baron Davis, Robert Herjavec, Ty Pennington and Amanda Brinkman. In 2021, the show was nominated for a Daytime Emmy Award for Outstanding Lifestyle Series.

Deluxe granted at least $750 in company stock to all of its employees in April 2019. Also in 2019, Deluxe secured a contract with Synchrony Financial. In 2020, McCarthy created a new management team, including the company's first-ever chief revenue officer, and instituted a new organizational structure.<ref
name="CNBC"/> The company announced it would open its FinTech and Customer Innovation Center in Sandy Springs, Georgia, in 2021, focusing on payment and cloud services business.

Deluxe acquired First American Payment Systems, a payment processing company, for $960 million in April 2021. The deal was Deluxe's largest to-date, and was aimed at growing Deluxe's digital payments business. First American provides tools for merchants to process in-store and online payments. Barron's reported that First American Payment Systems generated $300 million in revenue and the acquisition was expected to double the annual revenue of Deluxe's payments business.

Company acquisitions

Corporate overview 
Deluxe Corporation is a public company traded on the New York Stock Exchange. Formerly headquartered in Shoreview, Minnesota, it is now located at 801 South Marquette Avenue in downtown Minneapolis. Deluxe has four business divisions: cloud, payments, promotional products, and checks. As of 2020, Deluxe's clients include the Federal Reserve, 4.5 million small businesses and 4,000 financial institutions. Through its systems for customers to send and receive payments, Deluxe processes more than $2.8 trillion in annual payments.

Competitive overview 
In 2000 The New York Times described John H. Harland Company' as "the second-largest printer of checks in the United States." Walmart is another company that prints checks.

References

External links 
 
 

American companies established in 1915
Financial services companies established in 1915
Manufacturing companies established in 1915
Printing companies of the United States
Companies listed on the New York Stock Exchange
Manufacturing companies based in Minnesota
1915 establishments in Minnesota
Ramsey County, Minnesota